These are the official results of the Men's Pole Vault event at the 1993 IAAF World Championships in Stuttgart, Germany. There were a total of 45 participating athletes, with two qualifying groups (the qualification mark was set at 5.70m). The final was held on Thursday August 19, 1993.

Medalists

Schedule
 All times are Central European Time (UTC+1)

Abbreviations
 All results shown are in metres

Results

Qualifying round
 Held on Tuesday 1993-08-17

Qualification: Qualifying Performance 5.75 (Q) or at least 12 best performers (q) advance to the final.

Final

See also
 1988 Men's Olympic Pole Vault (Seoul)
 1990 Men's European Championships Pole Vault (Split)
 1992 Men's Olympic Pole Vault (Barcelona)
 1994 Men's European Championships Pole Vault (Helsinki)

References
 Results
 IAAF
Detailed results (p148)

P
Pole vault at the World Athletics Championships